Sympis parkeri is a moth of the family Noctuidae first described by Thomas Pennington Lucas in 1894. It is endemic to the Australian state of Queensland.

References

External links
"Species Sympis parkeri T.P. Lucas, 1894". Australian Faunal Directory. Archived October 5, 2012.

Catocalinae